Leucauge granulata is one of the long-jawed orb weaver spiders (family Tetragnathidae). It is found in India, Sri Lanka, China, the Sunda Islands (Indonensia), Australia, and French Polynesia. Leucauge granulata marginata is known to inhabit New Guinea. Leucauge granulata rimitara in French Polynesia.

A medium-sized spider, with a leg span around 45 mm long (female). Male to 15 mm. The humped shaped abdomen is silver, the head silver green with black. Legs are thin, brown to light green. The web is horizontal or slightly inclined, the spider rests upside down under the web, waiting for prey. Fangs oppose, and work in a pinching manner.

References

granulata
Spiders described in 1842
Spiders of Australia
Spiders of Asia
Spiders of Oceania